The "Argentine Army Military Merit Medal" 
is the fourth highest decoration awarded in the Argentine Army.

History 
The award was instituted on 6 May 1977 by Jorge Rafael Videla. In 1982 it was awarded during the Falklands War.

Recipients 
 Martín Antonio Balza
 Aldo Rico
 Horacio Losito
 Domingo Victor Alamo
 Marcelo Andres Florio

References

Sources 
 

Argentine Army
Orders, decorations, and medals of Argentina